Five Shaolin Masters a.k.a. 5 Masters Of Death (Chinese: 少林五祖) is a 1974 Shaw Brothers kung fu film directed by Chang Cheh, with action choreography by Lau Kar Leung and Lau Kar Wing.

The film focuses on Shaolin's historic rivalries with the Qing Dynasty.

Plot 
Five young fighters survive to escape the burning Shaolin temple after the Qing soldiers destroyed it in Shaolin Temple. The five regroup and establish secret codes to identify themselves and fellow patriots. They swear vengeance and decide to enlist other patriots, then reunite to escape from the Qing forces. They also commit to uncovering the identity of the traitorous insider who had sold out the Shaolin temple. 

The traitor, Ma Fu-Yi, joins with top Qing fighters to eliminate the rebels, but he is exposed by Ma Chao-Tsing, one of the five Shaolin escapees, who gets captured. Hu Te-Ti meets up with a group of Shaolin fighters secretly posing as bandits and recruits them to help rescue Ma Chao-Tsing. Their bandit leader is killed in the process, so the bandits join the rest of the Shaolin patriots to fight the Qing invaders.

Suffering successive defeats at the hands of the Qing kung fu experts, the five young fighters return to the Shaolin temple ruins to perfect their kung fu and prepare to take revenge for their destroyed temple and murdered comrades. Each of the five must face a more seasoned master in single combat, so each trains to master fighting forms and techniques to counter the specific skills and weaponry of each individual enemy, man-to-man.

Cast
The five Shaolin patriots: 
Ti Lung as Tsai Te-Chung
Alexander Fu Sheng as Ma Chao-Hsing
Meng Fei as Fang Ta-Hung
Chi Kuan Chun as Li Shih-Kai
David Chiang as Hu Te-Ti

Their five main adversaries: 
Liang Chia Jen as Chien San
Feng Ko An as Chang Chin-Chiu
Chiang Tao as Chen Wen-Yao
Tsai Hung as Pao Yu-Lung
Wang Lung Wei as Ma Fu-Yi

External links
 Five Shaolin Masters at Hong Kong Cinemagic
 
 

1974 films
1974 martial arts films
1970s action films
Films directed by Chang Cheh
Films set in 18th-century Qing dynasty
Hong Kong martial arts films
Kung fu films
Shaw Brothers Studio films
1970s Hong Kong films